Below is a list of Mayors of Toronto, Ontario, Canada. Toronto's first mayor, William Lyon Mackenzie was appointed in 1834 after his Reform coalition won the new City of Toronto's first election, and Mackenzie was chosen by the Reformers. The most recent mayor was John Tory, who served from 2014 to 2023.

History
From 1834 to 1857, and again from 1867 to 1873, Toronto mayors were not elected directly by the public. Instead, after each annual election of aldermen and councilmen, the assembled council would elect one of their members as mayor.  For all other years, mayors were directly elected by popular vote, except in rare cases where a mayor was appointed by council to fill an unexpired term of office. Prior to 1834, Toronto municipal leadership was governed by the Chairman of the General Quarter Session of Peace of the Home District Council.

Through 1955 the term of office for the mayor and council was one year; it then varied between two and three years until a four-year term was adopted starting in 2006. (See List of Toronto municipal elections.)

The "City of Toronto" has changed substantially over the years: the city annexed or amalgamated with neighbouring communities or areas 49 times from in 1883 to 1967. The most sweeping change was in 1998, when the six municipalities comprising Metropolitan Toronto—East York, Etobicoke, North York, Scarborough, York, and the former city of Toronto–and its regional government were amalgamated into a single City of Toronto (colloquially dubbed the "megacity") by an act of the provincial government. The newly created position of mayor for the resulting single-tier mega-city replaced all of the mayors of the former Metro municipalities. It also abolished the office of the Metro Chairman, which had formerly been the most senior political figure in the Metro government before amalgamation.

According to Victor Loring Russell, author of Mayors of Toronto Volume I, 14 out of the first 29 mayors were lawyers. According to Mark Maloney who is writing The History of the Mayors of Toronto, 58 of Toronto's 64 mayors (up to Ford) have been Protestant, white, English-speaking, Anglo-Saxon, property-owning males. There have been two women (Hall and Rowlands) and three Jewish mayors (Phillips, Givens and Lastman).

Art Eggleton is the longest-serving mayor of Toronto, serving from 1980 until 1991. Eggleton later served in federal politics from 1993 until 2004, and was appointed to the Senate of Canada in 2005. David Breakenridge Read held the post of mayor of Toronto for the shortest period; Read was mayor for only fifty days in 1858.

No Toronto mayor has been removed from office. Toronto's 64th mayor, Rob Ford, lost a conflict of interest trial in 2012, and was ordered to vacate his position; but the ruling was stayed pending an appeal, which Ford won to remain in office. Due to his substance abuse admission and controversy in 2013, Council stripped him of many powers on November 15, transferring them to the deputy mayor. From May until July, 2014, Ford took a leave of absence from the mayoralty to enter drug rehabilitation.

Original City of Toronto era

The Metro Toronto era (1953–1997)
From 1953, Toronto was part of a federated municipality known as Metropolitan Toronto. This regional entity had the same boundaries as present-day Toronto, but consisted of the City of Toronto and 12 other municipalities, each with its own mayor and council.  From 1953 to 1997, the most senior political figure in the Metropolitan Toronto government was the Chairman of the Municipality of Metropolitan Toronto (for a list of Metro Chairmen, see Chairman of the Municipality of Metropolitan Toronto). In 1967, (during the incumbency of William Dennison), an internal amalgamation eliminated the seven smallest municipalities in Metropolitan Toronto.  Of these, the villages of Forest Hill and Swansea were amalgamated into the City of Toronto.

Post-amalgamation era
As of 1998, Metropolitan Toronto and all its constituent municipalities were amalgamated into a single City of Toronto. Under the City of Toronto Act, 2006, the Mayor is the head of council and the chief executive officer of the City.

The deputy mayor is appointed by the mayor from among the elected members of the City Council. The deputy mayor acts in place of the mayor whenever the incumbent is unable to be present to perform his normal functions and duties, assists the mayor, and serves as vice-chair of the city council's executive committee.

On November 18, 2013, city council removed most powers from the office of mayor for the term of the current Council, including chairing the executive committee. These powers were given to the office of the deputy mayor, held by Norm Kelly at the time of the motion. The action occurred after Mayor Rob Ford admitted to drug abuse. On May 1, 2014, Ford started a leave of absence for drug rehabilitation. Kelly took over the remainder of the Mayoral duties and powers at that time. When Rob Ford returned on July 1, he once again returned to having the duties he had immediately prior to the leave. 

On February 10, 2023, Mayor John Tory announced that he would resign as the mayor, after admitting that he had had a multi-year affair with a former staffer during the COVID-19 pandemic. Tory also said that the relationship had been referred to the City's integrity commissioner for review. Deputy Mayor Jennifer McKelvie might assume the office of mayor.

Post-mayoral honours
A few former mayors have been honoured with places, things or buildings named in their honour. Unless otherwise stated the following are all located in Toronto:
 George William Allan – Allan Gardens
 William Henry Boulton – Boulton Avenue
 David Crombie – David Crombie Park
 Art Eggleton – Art Eggleton Park  
 Thomas Foster – Thomas Foster Memorial Temple in Uxbridge, Ontario, built by him privately and named after his death.

 Barbara Hall – Barbara Hall Park
 Allan A. Lamport – Lamport Stadium
 Mel Lastman – Mel Lastman Square
 William Lyon Mackenzie – current Toronto Fire Services fireboat WL Mackenzie and William Lyon Mackenzie Collegiate Institute
 Alexander Manning – Manning Arcade (c. 1884 and demolished 1954 after 1953 fires) and Manning Chambers (annex to Old City Hall and demolished to make way for Toronto City Hall 1960s)
 Sam McBride – current Toronto Island ferry boat Sam McBride
 George Monro – Munro Park (former amusement park, now residential area) and Munro Park Avenue
 Nathan Phillips – Nathan Phillips Square
 June Rowlands – June Rowlands Park
 Robert Hood Saunders – R.H. Saunders – St. Lawrence Station, a power station dam power dam in Cornwall, Ontario
 Joseph Sheard – (The Mayor) Joseph Sheard Parkette
 Donald Dean Summerville – Donald Dean Summerville Swimming Pool

See also

 List of Toronto municipal elections
 Metro Chairman – the most senior political figure in Metropolitan Toronto until 1997
 List of reeves of the former townships and villages in Toronto

References

Bibliography

External links
 
 

Toronto
Mayors